The NK-15 (GRAU index 11D51) was a rocket engine designed and built in the late 1960s by the Kuznetsov Design Bureau. The NK designation was derived from the initials of chief designer Nikolay Kuznetsov. The NK-15 was among the most powerful LOX/kerosene rocket engines when it was built, with a high specific impulse and low structural mass. It was intended for the ill-fated Soviet N-1 Moon rocket.

History 
The engine equipped the N1 rocket - the first two launch attempts failed due to this engine.  Its successor the NK-33 was to be used on the N1F, a new version of the N1, but the program was cancelled.

Versions 
 NK-15V (GRAU index 11D52): Modified NK-15 optimized for vacuum operation, used on the N1 second stage.

See also
Comparison of orbital rocket engines

References 

 NK-15, Encyclopedia Astronautica
 ОАО СНТК им. Н. Д. Кузнецова
 Propulsion  Nositel (N) -1

External links 

Rocket engines of the Soviet Union
Rocket engines using kerosene propellant
Soviet lunar program
Science and technology in the Soviet Union
Rocket engines using the staged combustion cycle